"I Come Alive" is a single by American rock band the Used, from the fifth studio album Vulnerable. The song impacted radio on February 14, 2012 along with a music video.

The music video depicts a boy getting bullied by other kids and getting abused by his own father. At the end, he gets revenge on his enemies by chasing and eventually killing the bullies with a baseball bat, stabs his father to death (graphic) and then stares at the body in anger. The band does not appear in this video.

Chart performance
The single debuted and peaked at number 29 on the Billboard Alternative songs chart

References

The Used songs
2012 singles
2012 songs
Hopeless Records singles
Songs written by Quinn Allman
Songs written by Jeph Howard
Songs written by Bert McCracken
Song recordings produced by John Feldmann